Magdi Wahba (1925–1991) was an Egyptian university professor, Johnsonian scholar, and lexicographer.

He was born in Alexandria in 1925, the son of a high court judge (Mourad Wahba Pasha) and later cabinet minister.  His mother had been educated at Cheltenham Ladies' College and Oxford University. The grandson of a Prime Minister (Youssef Wahba Pasha) he belonged to the Egyptian aristocracy of the time but was nonetheless a member of the communist party in his youth.  He was a graduate of Cairo University and the Sorbonne where he obtained a Diploma in High Studies in International Law in Paris (1947).  He decided to pursue his interests in English literature and went to Exeter College, Oxford University, and received his B.Litt. and D.Phil. in 1957.

During 1957–1966 and 1970–1980 Wahba taught English literature at Cairo University, Egypt. During that time he started the Annual Bulletin of English Studies which later became Cairo Studies in English published by the Department of English Language and Literature.  He continued supervising countless PhD students as emeritus professor.  After his death, the English Department's library at Cairo University was named after him.

He also served for four years between 1966 and 1970 as the Undersecretary of State to the Ministry of Culture for Egypt where he organized in 1967 the Cairo Millennium event to celebrate the millennial anniversary of the city of Cairo.  The event is considered by many as one of the great cultural event to occur in recent Egyptian history.  It included scholars from all over the world, including academics such as Bernard Lewis, notwithstanding his sympathies to Israel.

His key contributions to literature include some of the only English translations of Egyptian authors Naguib Mahfouz and Taha Hussein.  He also edited existing versions of the authors' works in English.  He was a well-known scholar of Samuel Johnson, editing Johnsonian Studies, which included the oft-referenced bibliography of Johnson by James Clifford and Donald Greene. Wahba introduced to the Arabic reader the first Arabic translation of Johnson's Rasselas in 1959 and Chaucer's The Canterbury Tales in 1984. He edited the commemorative lectures for the bicentennial of Samuel Johnson's death celebrated at Oxford University in 1986, published by Longman.  In 1989, shortly before his death, he published an article in the Journal of Arabic Literature entitled "An Anger Observed" that summarized the anger and suspicion felt by the Muslim world towards the West.  The article was shortly after translated into Arabic and widely seen among Muslim scholars as an example of how it is possible to understand the Muslim viewpoint and develop a dialogue between the Muslim world and the West.

Wahba produced several lexicographic works, including several English–Arabic dictionaries.  His Dictionary of Literary Terms, published in 1974 and re-issued several times, has become an important tool for scholars of comparative literature in the Arab world. In 1989 he published Al-Mukhtar: a Concise English–Arabic Dictionary, considered as one of the most thorough dictionaries of its kind.  The Mukhtar was followed by An Nafeess, published after his death.

He was elected a member of the Academy of the Arabic Language in Cairo in 1980,  as well as a member of the Institut d'Égypte (founded in 1798 by Bonaparte) and became its secretary-general shortly after. He was also an active member of the International Committee for Philosophy and the Social Sciences (CIPSH).  While he shied away from political roles (he declined a ministerial position offered by President Sadat), he was a member of the Shura Council (Egyptian Senate), following the footsteps of his father and grandfather Youssef Wahba. He died in London in 1991 from Leukemia.

References
Baraka, Magda (1998). The Egyptian Upper Class between Revolutions 1919–1952. Reading: Ithaca Press.
Cairo Studies in English (1990). Essays in Honour of Magdi Wahba. Published by the Department of English Language and Literature, University of Cairo, Cairo.
Vatikiotis, P.J. (1997).  The Middle East: From the end of Empire to the end of the Cold War. London: Routledge.
Wahba, Magdi (ed.)(1962). Johnsonian Studies: Including a Bibliography of Johnsonian Studies, 1950–1960 Compiled by James L. Clifford and Donald J. Greene. Cairo: Oxford University Press.
Wahba, Magdi (1974). A Dictionary of Literary Terms, English-French-Arabic. Beirut: Librairie du Liban.
Wahba, Magdi (1989). Al Mukhtar: A Concise English–Arabic Dictionary. Beirut: Librairie du Liban.
Wahba, Magdi (1989). "An Anger Observed". Journal of Arabic Literature, Vol. XX, London: Brill.
Wahba, Magdi (1990). Cairo Memories in Studies in Arab History: The Antonius Lectures, 1978–87. Edited by Derek Hopwood. London: Macmillan Press.

Obituary notices
Albert Hourani, "Magdi Wahba", The Independent, October 1991
The Times, October 1991
 Andre Raymond "Magdi Wahba", Institut Francais d'Archeologie Orientale IFAO, Volume 93,

Literary critics of English
Egyptian lexicographers
Arab lexicographers
Cairo University alumni
Alumni of Exeter College, Oxford
University of Paris alumni
Egyptian Copts
Academic staff of Cairo University
Members of the Shura Council
1925 births
1991 deaths
Deaths from leukemia
Deaths from cancer in England
Egyptian expatriates in France
Egyptian expatriates in the United Kingdom
20th-century lexicographers
Members of Academy of the Arabic Language in Cairo